(born 22 September 1971) is a Japanese musical composer and arranger under Giza Studio label since 2000.

Biography
Since college he worked as orchestrator, then start working as a bassist. For artists as Zard, Mai Kuraki, B'z and many others from Being Inc. Tokunaga provided for them music and arrangements, participate in the live support for more than 15 years. Tokunaga is working as a bassist with high technology. He also participated in many chorus parts which he makes on his own. He is member of rock band doa as vocalist and bassist. Beside of this he's doing programming, is in charge of piano, organ, guitar, mandolin and percussion. He is famous for the composer of Dragon Ball GT replacing Shunsuke Kikuchi.

List of provided works as composer and arranger

compositions and arrangements

Band-Maid
Don't Let Me Down
Order

Mai Kuraki
Feel Fine!
Winter Bells
Stand Up
Make my day
Fairy tale -my last teenage wish-
Diamond Wave
Yume ga Saku Haru

Zard
Eien
Photograph
Sawayakana Kimi no Kimochi
Seven Rainbow
Vintage
Ai wo Shinjiteitai

U-ka Saegusa in dB
Whenever I think of you
Kimi no Hitomi no Naka de Mystery
June Bride ~Anata shika mienai~

Yumi Shizukusa
Take me Take me
Sometimes
Control your touch
I still believe ~Tameiki~

Akane Sugazaki
Kimi no Namae Yobu dake de

Ai Takaoka
Jinsei wa Paradise!

The★tambourines
Stay young
After wish

Azumi Uehara
Lazy

WAG
Just wanna be
Time waits for no one
Fukisusabu Kaze no Naka de
Don't look back again
Play One More For

Aya Kamiki
Secret Night

Caos Caos Caos
Far away~Aozora Miagete~

Aiko Kitahara
Da da da, grand blue

Natsuiro 
Answer, We'll be One Heart, One Love
Exotic Love

UMI☆KUUN 
I'm just feeling alive

List of provided works as a composer

Zard
Pray
Good-night sweet heart

Aiuchi Rina
Dream×Dream
Especial thanks,
I'll be delighted
Broken Heart
Wish
Be distant

Azumi Uehara 
Himitsu

Aya Kamiki
Communication Break

Mai Kuraki
Be With U
Born to be Free
TRY AGAIN
Barairo no Jinsei

grram
Kanashii Hodo Kyou no Yuuhi Kirei ne
Orange no Sora

U-ka Saegusa in dB
Passionate Wave

Yumi Shizukusa
Keep it Love

Shiori Takei
Like a little Love
Slow step
New day
Ano Umi ga Mietara

The★tambourines
wonder boy

Manish
Iranai

Natsuiro
Bitter & Sweet Rhapsody

Aiko Kitahara
Tango

List of provided work as an arranger

Miho Komatsu
Mysterious Love
Watashi Sagashi
Toori Ame
Kawaita Sakebi

B'z
Ultra Soul
Calling
Liar! Liar!
Green
It's Showtime!
Ocean
The Circle
Survive

Zard
Tooi Hoshi wo Kazoete
Makenaide (in d-project)
Hitomi Tojite
Tenshi no you na Egao de

Koshi Inaba
Hane
Stay free
Kodoku no Susume
Toumei Ningen
Saitahe Hotel

Field of View
Dear old days
Dreams
Someday
Aoi Kasa de
Rainy day
When I call your name

Tube 
Natsu no Mahou
Aoi Melody
I'm in love you, good day sunshine

Keiko Utoku
Realize
Trust me
Change your life
Are you kidding

Mai Kuraki
Brand New Day, Like a star in the night

Deen
Tegotae no nai Ai

U-ka Saegusa in dB
Tears Go By
Graduation
Secret & Lies
CHU☆TRUE LOVE

Les Mauvais Garçonnes
Otoko to Onna
Yume Miru Chanson Ningyo

Misia
Koi Uta, Don't stop music

Ai Takaoka
Kimi no Soba de, Natsu no Aru hi ni, You're Still The One

Yumi Shizukusa
Wonderful World

Breakerz
Bokura, Ao no Mirai

Azumi Uehara
Mushoku

Marie Ueda
Yume no Parade
Wakannani no wa Iya da
Synchro
RRRRR
Clear
FAR

Natsuiro
Summer Spur
For Dear
Girls song!!!

Caos Caos Caos 
Good-bye Memories

Sayuri Iwata
Sora Tobu Ano Shiroi Kumo no you ni

Interview
Entertainmentstation 23.5.2016
Ikebe Times 22.17.2017

References

External links
Official profile 
Official Twitter 

1971 births
Living people
Being Inc. artists
Japanese male composers
Japanese music arrangers
Japanese rock bass guitarists
Musicians from Yokohama
20th-century Japanese male musicians
21st-century Japanese male musicians